Terence "Tété" Makengo (born 22 June 1992) is a French professional footballer of Congolese descent who plays for Swiss club SR Delémont. He is the son of former professional football player Sabhou Makengo.

Career
Born in Boulogne-sur-Mer, he plays as a striker and is a former graduate of the Clairefontaine academy. Makengo is also a French youth international having represented France at under-17 level. On 3 November 2008, at the age of 16, he signed his first professional contract agreeing to a three-year deal with Monaco until 1 July 2011. The agreement made him the youngest player in the club's history to sign a professional contract.

On 10 November 2010, almost two years after signing his professional contract, Makengo made his professional debut in a Coupe de la Ligue match against Marseille appearing as a substitute in a 2–1 defeat. Makengo's development at Monaco has been traced by several clubs, notably Italian club Internazionale and English club Chelsea.

On 27 June 2011, Makengo signed a new professional contract agreeing to a three-year deal with Monaco. In July 2012, he joined Ligue 2 side AJ Auxerre on a loan deal.

In September 2013, Makengo left Monaco despite still having a year remaining on his contract, signing a three-year deal with Châteauroux. After two years as a regular in Ligue 2, he didn't make any appearances in the 2015–16 season, and left the club at the conclusion of his contract. In late 2016 he signed for Polish I liga side Zagłębie Sosnowiec on an 18-month deal.

Makengo returned to France in July 2018, signing for Les Herbiers VF. On leaving Les Herbiers in the summer of 2019, he signed for Villefranche, but only played with their B team in Régional 2 (7th tier), and in January 2020 he signed for Moulins Yzeure Foot. In June 2020 he returned to Villefranche.

Career statistics
.

References

External links
 
 
 
 

1992 births
Living people
People from Boulogne-sur-Mer
French sportspeople of Democratic Republic of the Congo descent
Sportspeople from Pas-de-Calais
French footballers
French expatriate footballers
Association football forwards
Black French sportspeople
Footballers from Hauts-de-France
AS Monaco FC players
AJ Auxerre players
LB Châteauroux players
Zagłębie Sosnowiec players
Les Herbiers VF players
FC Villefranche Beaujolais players
SR Delémont players
Ligue 2 players
Championnat National players
Championnat National 2 players
Championnat National 3 players
I liga players
Swiss 1. Liga (football) players
French expatriate sportspeople in Monaco
French expatriate sportspeople in Poland
French expatriate sportspeople in Switzerland
Expatriate footballers in Monaco
Expatriate footballers in Poland
Expatriate footballers in Switzerland